Dysmilichia is a genus of moths of the family Noctuidae.

Species
 Dysmilichia fukudai
 Dysmilichia gemella
 Dysmilichia namibiae Hacker, 2007

References
Hacker, H.H., in Mey 2007, Esperiana Buchreihe zur Entomologie Esperiana Memoir 4: 219-235.
Natural History Museum Lepidoptera genus database

Acontiinae